Natalia Nicolaevna Malykh (born 8 December 1993 in Volgograd) is a Russian volleyball player, who plays as an opposite. She is member of the Russia women's national volleyball team and plays for Dinamo Krasnodar. Malykh was part of the Russian team which won the European Championships of 2013 and 2015.
In 2017, Malykh married Ruslan Bykanov, a beach volleyball player.

Career
Malykh started playing volleyball at the age of eight, when he joined her hometown youth team Volzhanochki Volgograd. In 2009, she was promoted to the first team, where she played for three seasons, taking part in the Liga B, third level of the Russian championship.

She played for the youth national team of Russia in the 2010 Junior European Championship in Serbia and the 2011 U20 World Championship in Peru.

For the 2012-13 season she is signed with VC Zarechie Odintsovo, debuting at the Russian Superligue and winning the 2013–14 Challenge Cup. In 2013, she made her debut for the senior Russian national team, at the Montreux Volley Masters and finish the tournament in second place. Later that year she took part in the XVII Universiade and at the European Championship, winning both competitions. In 2014, she won the bronze medal at the World Grand Prix and in 2015 she was silver medalist in the World Grand Prix and gold at the European Championship.

Ahead of the 2015–16 season she joined Dinamo Krasnodar, signing a two-year contract with the club. On 3 December 2015 Dinamo Krasnodar won the Women's Volley Russian Cup, beating Dinamo Kazan in the final, her first title with the club. On 2 April 2016 she won her second title with the club by claiming the 2016 CEV Women's Cup, defeating Galatasaray Istanbul in the two legs final.

In 2017, Malykh married Ruslan Bykanov, a beach volleyball player.

Clubs
  Voljanotchka Volgograd (2009–2012)
  VC Zarechie Odintsovo (2012–2015)
  Dinamo Krasnodar (2015–present)

Awards

Individuals
 2014 Montreux Volley Masters "Best Scorer"
 2013–14 CEV Challenge Cup "Most Valuable Player" 
 2015–16 CEV Cup "Most Valuable Player" 
 2015–16 CEV Cup "Best Spiker"

National team

Junior
 2013 Universiade –  Gold Medal

Senior
 2013 Montreux Volley Masters –  Silver Medal
 2013 Boris Yeltsin Cup –  Gold Medal
 2013 European Championship –  Gold Medal
 2014 Montreux Volley Masters –  Bronze Medal
 2014 Boris Yeltsin Cup –  Silver Medal
 2014 FIVB World Grand Prix –  Bronze Medal
 2015 Boris Yeltsin Cup –  Gold Medal
 2015 FIVB World Grand Prix –  Silver Medal
 2015 European Championship –  Gold Medal

Clubs
 2013–14 CEV Challenge Cup –  Champion, with Zarechie Odintsovo
 2015 Russian Cup –  Champion, with Dinamo Krasnodar
 2015–16 CEV Cup –  Champion, with Dinamo Krasnodar
 2015–16 Russian League -  Bronze Medal, with Dinamo Krasnodar

References

External links
 FIVB Profile

1993 births
Living people
Sportspeople from Volgograd
Russian women's volleyball players
Universiade medalists in volleyball
Universiade gold medalists for Russia
Medalists at the 2013 Summer Universiade
Medalists at the 2017 Summer Universiade
20th-century Russian women
21st-century Russian women